The Bahamas national basketball team represents The Bahamas in international men's basketball.

The Bahamas has traditionally been the dominant nation at the official Caribbean Basketball Championship as it won more gold medals and more overall medals than any contender.

Competitions

FIBA AmeriCup

Pan American Games

 1975: 9th place
 1991: 8th place
2023 : To be determined

Centrobasket Championship
 1975: 5th place
 1985: 8th place
 1989: 8th place
 1995: 5th place
 2003: 5th place
 2012: 5th place
 2014: 7th place
 2016: 7th place

CBC Championship

 1982: 
 1984: 
 1985: 
 1991: 
 1993: 
 1995: 
 1996: 
 1998: 
 2002: 4th place
 2004: 5th place
 2006: 4th place
 2007: 4th place
 2009: 5th place
 2011: 
 2014: 
 2015:

Current roster
Roster for the 2022 FIBA AmeriCup qualification matches played on 19 and 20 February 2021 against the United States and Puerto Rico.

Depth chart

Past rosters
At 2009 FIBA CBC Championship:

At the 2016 Centrobasket:

Head coach position
  Larry Brown – 2011, 2012
  Larry Eustachy – 2014
  Mario Bowleg – 2015 - 2018
  Norris Bain – 2019
  Chris Demarco – since 2019

Kit

Manufacturer
2015: Under Armour

2017 - Present : Nike

See also
Bahamas women's national basketball team
Bahamas national under-19 basketball team
Bahamas national under-17 basketball team

References

External links 
 Bahamas Basketball Federation
 FIBA Profile
 Latinbasket.com - Bahamas Men National Team
 Bahamas Basketball Records at FIBA Archive

Videos
Bahamas v Mexico - Highlights - FIBA AmeriCup 2021 Qualifiers - Youtube.com video

Bahamas national basketball team
1962 establishments in the Bahamas